Glienicke may refer to the following places in Germany:

 Glienicke Palace, a historic palace in Berlin-Wannsee in Germany
 Glienicke Bridge
 Jagdschloss Glienicke, a hunting castle
 Glienicke/Nordbahn, a municipality in the Oberhavel district, in Brandenburg, Germany

See also
 Altglienicke, a locality of Berlin 
 Groß Glienicke, a village in Potsdam and Berlin
 Klein Glienicke, part of Potsdam